The A1 is the longest numbered road in the United Kingdom, at . It connects London, the capital of England, with Edinburgh, the capital of Scotland. It passes through or near North London, Hatfield, Welwyn Garden City, Stevenage, Baldock, Letchworth Garden City, Biggleswade, St Neots, Huntingdon, Peterborough, Stamford, Grantham, Newark-on-Trent, Retford, Doncaster, York, Pontefract, Wetherby, Ripon, Darlington, Durham, Sunderland, Gateshead, Newcastle upon Tyne, Morpeth, Alnwick and Berwick-upon-Tweed.

It was designated by the Ministry of Transport in 1921, and for much of its route it followed various branches of the historic Great North Road, the main deviation being between Boroughbridge and Darlington. The course of the A1 has changed where towns or villages have been bypassed, and where new alignments have taken a slightly different route. Several sections of the route have been upgraded to motorway standard and designated A1(M). Between the M25 (near London) and the A720 (near Edinburgh) the road is part of the unsigned Euroroute E15 from Inverness to Algeciras.

History

The A1 is the latest in a series of routes north from London to York and beyond. It was designated in 1921 by the Ministry of Transport under the Great Britain road numbering scheme. The earliest documented northern routes are the roads created by the Romans during the period from AD 43 to AD 410, which consisted of several itinera (plural of iter) recorded in the Antonine Itinerary. A combination of these were used by the Anglo-Saxons as the route from London to York, and together became known as Ermine Street. Ermine Street later became known as the Old North Road. Part of this route in London is followed by the current A10. By the 12th century, because of flooding and damage by traffic, an alternative route out of London was found through Muswell Hill, and became part of the Great North Road. A turnpike road, New North Road and Canonbury Road (A1200 road), was constructed in 1812 linking the start of the Old North Road around Shoreditch with the Great North Road at Highbury Corner. While the route of the A1 outside London mainly follows the Great North Road route used by mail coaches between London and Edinburgh, within London the coaching route is only followed through Islington.

Bypasses were built around Barnet and Hatfield in 1927, but it was not until c.1954 that they were renumbered A1. In the 1930s bypasses were added around Chester-le-Street and Durham and the Ferryhill Cut was dug. In 1960 Stamford, Biggleswade and Doncaster were bypassed, as were Retford in 1961 and St Neots in 1971. Baldock was bypassed in July 1967. During the early 1970s plans to widen the A1 along Archway Road in London were abandoned after considerable opposition and four public inquiries during which road protesters disrupted proceedings. The scheme was finally dropped in 1990. The Hatfield cut-and-cover was opened in 1986.

A proposal to upgrade the whole of the A1 to motorway status was investigated by the government in 1989 but was dropped in 1995, along with many other schemes, in response to road protests against other road schemes (including the Newbury Bypass and the M3 extension through Twyford Down).

Inns

The inns on the road, many of which still survive, were staging posts on the coach routes, providing accommodation, stabling for the horses and replacement mounts. Few of the surviving coaching inns can be seen while driving on the A1, because the modern route now bypasses the towns with the inns.

Route

The A1 runs from New Change in the City of London at St. Paul's Cathedral to the centre of Edinburgh. It shares its London terminus with the A40, in the City area of Central London. It runs out of London via St. Martin's Le Grand and Aldersgate Street, through Islington (where Goswell Road and Upper Street form part of its route), up Holloway Road, through Highgate, and Barnet. 

The road enters Hertfordshire just before Potters Bar, near the junction with the M25 at the South Mimms Services. The route here becomes the A1(M) and subsequently passes through Hatfield, Welwyn, Stevenage, Baldock, Biggleswade, Sandy and St Neots.

Continuing north, the A1 runs on modern bypasses around Stamford, Grantham, Newark-on-Trent, Retford, Bawtry, Doncaster, Knottingley, Garforth, Wetherby, Knaresborough, Boroughbridge, Scotch Corner, Darlington, Newton Aycliffe, Durham and Chester-le-Street, past the Angel of the North sculpture and the Metrocentre in Gateshead, through the western suburbs of Newcastle upon Tyne, Morpeth, Alnwick, Berwick-upon-Tweed, into Scotland at Marshall Meadows, past Haddington and Musselburgh before arriving in Edinburgh at the East End of Princes Street near Waverley Station, at the junction of the A7, A8 and A900 roads.

Scotch Corner, in North Yorkshire, marks the point where before the M6 was built, the traffic for Glasgow and the west of Scotland diverged from that for Edinburgh. As well as a hotel there have been a variety of sites for the transport café, now subsumed as a motorway services.

Overview and post-First World War developments

A  section of the road in North Yorkshire, from Walshford to Dishforth, was upgraded to motorway standard in 1995. Neolithic remains and a Roman fort were discovered.

A  section of the road from Alconbury to Peterborough was upgraded to motorway standard at a cost of £128 million (£ as of ), which opened in 1998 requiring moving the memorial to Napoleonic prisoners buried at Norman Cross.

A number of sections between Newcastle and Edinburgh were dualled between 1999 and 2004, including a  section from Spott Wood to Oswald Dean in 1999,  sections from Bowerhouse to Spott Road and from Howburn to Houndwood in 2002–2003 and the  "A1 Expressway", from Haddington and Dunbar in 2004. The total cost of these works was £50 million.

Plans to dual the single carriageway section of road north of Newcastle upon Tyne were shelved in 2006 as they were not considered a regional priority by central government. The intention was to dual the road between Morpeth and Felton and between Adderstone and Belford.

In 1999 a section of A1(M) between Bramham and Hook Moor opened to traffic along with the extension of the M1 from Leeds. Under a DBFO contract, sections from Wetherby to Walshford and Darrington to Hook Moor were opened in 2005 and 2006.

Recent developments

A1 Peterborough to Blyth grade separated junctions
Between September 2006 and October 2009 six roundabouts on the A1 and the A1(M) to Alconbury were replaced with grade-separated junctions. This project cost £96 million.

A1(M) Bramham to Wetherby motorway
The scheme's public inquiry began on 18 October 2006 and the project was designed by James Poyner. Work began in May 2007, the motorway section opened in July 2009 and remaining work on side roads was still ongoing in late August and was expected to be completed by the end of 2009.

A1(M) Dishforth to Leeming motorway
Upgrading of the existing dual carriageway to dual three-lane motorway standard, with a local road alongside for non-motorway traffic, between Dishforth (A1(M)/A168 junction) and Leeming Bar, began in March 2009 and opened to traffic on or about the scheduled date of 31 March 2012.

A1(M) Leeming to Barton motorway
It had originally been proposed that the road would be upgraded to motorway from Dishforth to Barton (between Scotch Corner and Darlington), which was the start of current northernmost section of A1(M). In 2010 the section between Leeming and Barton was cancelled as part of government spending cuts but it was reinstated in December 2012. Work began on 3 April 2014 and was expected to be completed by Spring 2017, but only reached completion in March 2018 due in part to significant Roman-era archaeological finds along the route of the motorway.   Completion has provided a continuous motorway-standard road between Darrington (south of M62 junction) and Washington, and given the North East and North Yorkshire full motorway access to London (via the M1 at Darrington and Hook Moor).

Councils in the north east have called for the section from Hook Moor in Yorkshire (where the M1 link road joins the A1(M)) to Washington to be renumbered as the M1. They maintain that this would raise the profile of the north-east and be good for business.

A1 (Gateshead Western Bypass)
In his Autumn Statement on 5 December 2012, the Chancellor of the Exchequer announced that the Government would upgrade a section of road from two to three lanes in each direction within the highway boundary at Lobley Hill (between Coal House and the Metro Centre), Gateshead at a cost of £64 m and create parallel link roads between the Lobley Hill and Gateshead Quay junctions. The same Road investment strategy announcement said that the remaining section of road between Birtley and Coal House will also be widened to three lanes each way, alongside the replacement of the Allerdene Bridge. A modified scheme commenced in August 2014 and was open to traffic in June 2016. The road is now three lanes each way with lane 3 narrower than lanes 1 and 2 so that all existing bridges remained as originally built.

The A1 around Durham, Gateshead and Newcastle has seen a number of incarnations, following routes through, to the east and to the west of both Gateshead and Newcastle.   See A1 (Newcastle upon Tyne) for more information.

Ongoing developments

A1 Grantham Southern Relief Road
A new junction is currently under construction on the A1 south of Grantham. Highways England will construct 4 new slip roads to connect the A1 Trunk Road to the new Grantham Southern Relief Road being constructed by Lincolnshire County Council. This will create a southern entry to Grantham and also to the site known as the ‘King 31 Development’. The King 31 (Phase 1) is the section from the Grade Separated Junction to the B1174 (now completed). Phase three is the Southern Quadrant Link Road (SQLR). The Grantham Transport Strategy 2007-2021 identified the need for an east west relief road to bypass the centre of Grantham for traffic and open up the town and surrounding area to a significant amount of growth.

Proposed developments

A1(M) Red House to Darrington motorway
In the "Road investment strategy" announced to Parliament by the Department for Transport and Secretary of State for Transport on 1 December 2014, planning will begin to upgrade the road in South Yorkshire to raise the last non-motorway section from Red House to Darrington to motorway standard. Once completed, it will provide a continuous motorway-standard road between Blyth, Nottinghamshire and Washington, Tyne and Wear and will provide the North East and Yorkshire with full motorway access to London via the M1, M62 and M18. It will also improve safety along this route, as well as creating a new corridor to the North East, and reducing congestion on the M1 around Sheffield and Leeds.  This is the only missing link of motorway on the strategic M1/M18/A1(M) route London to Washington.

A1 Scotswood to North Brunton
The same announcement said that the road from Scotswood to North Brunton would be widened to three lanes each way, with four lanes each way between some junctions.

A1 Morpeth to Ellingham
The announcement then said that the road from Morpeth to Ellingham would be upgraded to dual carriageway. The selection of the preferred route was scheduled for the year 2017, with construction due to begin in 2019. In response to questions regarding transport in the north, Highways England stated that a new dual carriageway section between Morpeth and Fenton and also that of Alnwick to Ellingham would start in 2021 with full opening in 2023.  However in June 2022 UK government minister Grant Shapps delayed a decision about a Development Consent Order signing off on National Highways' plans until December 2022.

A1 North of Ellingham
Measures were also announced to enhance the performance and safety of the A1 north of Ellingham to include three sections of climbing lanes, five junctions with improved right turn refuges, and better crossing facilities for pedestrians and cyclists. Start of construction is scheduled for 2018.

Ellington to Fen Ditton scheme

The planned A14 Ellington to Fen Ditton scheme would require a new junction at Brampton, north of which the A1 will be widened to a three-lane dual carriageway from Brampton to the Brampton Hut interchange. The new two-lane dual carriageway section of the A14 would run parallel with the A1 on this section.

Black Cat roundabout replacement

The same announcement in December 2014 said that the A1/A421 Black Cat Roundabout would be replaced with a grade-separated junction, just a few years after this roundabout was expensively upgraded.

A46 Newark northern bypass scheme

It was then also announced that planning would begin to upgrade the Newark northern bypass to dual carriageway, and the A46 junction with the A1 will be replaced to support nearby housing growth and improve links from the A1 to Newark and Lincoln.

A1(M) Doncaster By-pass
It was also announced that the Doncaster By-pass, which is the oldest stretch of two-lane motorway still in service, would be upgraded to dual three lanes. This will relieve local congestion and provide the capacity needed to make the A1 an alternative (and better) strategic route to the north east.

Sandy-Beeston By-pass

In 2003 a proposal for a bypass of Sandy and Beeston, Bedfordshire, was put forward as a green-lighted scheme as part of a government multi-modal study, with a cost of £67 million. However, the Highways Agency was unwilling to confirm the information as the study was preliminary and intended for future publication. In 2008 the proposal was submitted for consideration in the pre-2013/14 Regional Funding Advice 2 Programme of the East of England Development Agency.

A1(M) technology enhancements and upgrades; A1 East of England feasibility study
It was also announced in 2014 that new technology would be implemented to bring the road to motorway standards, including detection loops, CCTV cameras and variable message signs to provide better information for drivers and active traffic management across Tyne and Wear, while Junction 6 (Welwyn North) to Junction 8 (Hitchin) would be upgraded to smart motorway, including widening of a two-lane section to dual three lanes and hard shoulder running.

A strategic study will examine how to improve the safety and performance of the A1 between Peterborough and the M25, including whether to upgrade the old dual carriageway section to motorway standard.

Other proposals
The Highways Agency has been investigating an upgrade of the A1 Newcastle/Gateshead Western Bypass to dual three-lane motorway standard to alleviate heavy congestion which in recent years has become a recurrent problem.

Improvements to junctions near the village of Elkesley, Nottinghamshire are planned: the village's only access to the rest of the road network is via the A1.

Consideration is being given to widening the Brampton Hut interchange to Alconbury sections to a three-lane dual carriageway.

A1(M) 

Some sections of the A1 have been upgraded to motorway standard. These are known as the A1(M) and include:

M25 to Stotfold

The main destinations are Hatfield, Welwyn Garden City, Stevenage, and Letchworth. It opened in five stages: junctions 1 to 2 in 1979; 2 to 4 in 1986; 4 to 6 in 1973; 6 to 8 in 1962; and 8 to 10 in 1967.

Alconbury to Peterborough

Doncaster By-pass

The Doncaster By-pass opened in 1961 and is one of the oldest sections of motorway in Britain.

Darrington to Gateshead

The Darrington to Gateshead section was constructed between 1965 and 2018.
 Junctions 56 to 59 in 1965
 Junctions 59 to 63 in 1969
 Junctions 63 to 65 in 1970
 Walshford to 49 in 1995
 Junctions 43 to 44 in 1999
When this section opened it ended at a temporary terminus south of the M1. There was a final exit into Micklefield Village for non-motorway traffic onto what is now the access road. During the first week of June 2009, Junctions 44 and 45 were renumbered 43 and 44. At the same time the A1/A659 Grange Moor junction became A1(M) Junction 45. As a result many atlases show incorrect junction numbering for this stretch of motorway.
 Junction 46 to temporary junction at Walshford opened in 2005
 Junction 40 to south of 43 opened in 2005 & 2006
The northern section of the upgrade, bypassing Fairburn village opened in April 2005 with a temporary connection with the A1 between Fairburn and Brotherton. The southern section, with a free-flow interchange with the M62 motorway opened on 13 January 2006.
 Junctions 44 to 46 opened in 2009
 Junctions 49 to 51 opened as of 31 March 2012. Work began in March 2009 to upgrade the Dishforth to Leeming section to dual three-lane motorway standard with existing connections being replaced by two new junctions. This work was completed on 31 March 2012.
 Junctions 51 to 56 opened in 2017 & 2018.

In popular culture
The A1 is celebrated in song. It is mentioned by Jethro Tull on the title track of the album Too Old to Rock 'n' Roll: Too Young to Die! "Up on the A1 by Scotch Corner". "Scotch Corner," by the Welsh band Man, on the album Rhinos, Winos and Lunatics is about an encounter there. Near the southern end, signs saying "Hatfield and the North" inspired the eponymous 1970s rock band Hatfield and the North. The A1 is mentioned in The Long Blondes' song, "Separated By Motorways", along with the A14. The A1(M) is mentioned in the song "Gabadon" by Sheffield band, Haze. Andrew Blackman's 2009 novel "On the Holloway Road", inspired by Jack Kerouac's On the Road, centres on a road trip along the A1.

Junctions

References

External links

 BiffVernon: A1-The Great North Road
 A1 at Roader's Digest (SABRE)
 roadsUK: A1

 
Motorways in England
Roads in England
Roads in Scotland
Transport in the London Borough of Barnet
Transport in the London Borough of Islington
Transport in Bedfordshire
Transport in East Lothian
Transport in Edinburgh
Roads in Hertfordshire
Transport in Lincolnshire
Transport in Northumberland
Transport in Nottinghamshire
Transport in the Scottish Borders
Transport in Tyne and Wear
Roads in Yorkshire
Boroughbridge